Otello Ternelli (23 November 1912 – 28 January 1974) was an Italian gymnast. He competed in eight events at the 1936 Summer Olympics.

References

External links
 

1912 births
1974 deaths
Italian male artistic gymnasts
Olympic gymnasts of Italy
Gymnasts at the 1936 Summer Olympics
Place of birth missing